Gratentour XIII are a French Rugby league club based in Gratentour, Haute-Garonne in the Midi-Pyrénées region. The club plays in the French Elite 2 Championship.

History 

Gratentour Rugby XIII have won two Coupe Falcou in 2010 and 2019. They had lost out to AS Clairac XIII in the National 2, now called the National Division 1, league final 4-34 one year before. Recently in season 2012/13 they reached the regional Midi-Pyrenees National Division 2 league final against Cahors Lot XIII and the final of French National Division 2 league final in 2018/2019 against Saint-Estève XIII catalan reserve grade.

Club honours 

 Coupe Falcou (1): 2010
 Coupe Falcou (1): 2019

Club Details 

President: 
Club Address: 1, rue Cayssial Gratentour
Tel:
Email:

See also 

National Division 2

External links 

 Club Website

French rugby league teams
1982 establishments in France
Rugby clubs established in 1982